Baliakandi is an Upazila of Rajbari District in the Division of Dhaka, Bangladesh.

Geography
It has a total area of 242.53 km2.

Demographics

According to the 2011 Bangladesh census, Baliakandi Upazila had 46,262 households and a population of 207,086, 4.8% of whom lived in urban areas. 9.6% of the population was under the age of 5. The literacy rate (age 7 and over) was 55.5%, compared to the national average of 51.8%.

Administration
Baliakandi Upazila is divided into seven union parishads: Baharpur, Baliakandi, Islampur, Jamalpur, Jangal, Narua, and Nawabpur. The union parishads are subdivided into 149 mauzas and 258 villages.

See also
Upazilas of Bangladesh
Districts of Bangladesh
Divisions of Bangladesh
Rajdharpur
Baliakandi (Town)
Baharpur High School

References

Upazilas of Rajbari District